Lake Windsor is a man-made lake in the Bella Vista area of Benton County in northwest Arkansas, United States. The lake is on Tanyard Creek just upstream from its confluence with Little Sugar Creek.

References

Bodies of water of Benton County, Arkansas
Reservoirs in Arkansas
Bella Vista, Arkansas